Kishidaria is a genus of tiger moths in the family Erebidae.

Species
The genus consists of the following species:
Kishidaria khasiana (Moore, 1878)
Kishidaria siniaevi (Witt & Speidel, 2006)
Kishidaria takamukui (Matsumura, 1930)
Kishidaria zerenaria (Oberthür, 1886)

References
 , (2004): Some generic changes in Arctiinae from South Eurasia with description of three new genera (Lepidoptera, Arctiidae). Atalanta 35 (1/2): 73-83, colour plate IVa.
 , (2010): Tiger-moths of Eurasia (Lepidoptera, Arctiidae) (Nyctemerini by Rob de Vos & Vladimir V. Dubatolov). Neue Entomologische Nachrichten 65: 1-106.

Callimorphina
Moth genera